The Portland city auditor is one of the six citywide elected positions in Portland, Oregon. The auditor is the only elected official functionally independent of City Council and accountable only to the public. The auditor exists "to promote open and accountable government by providing independent and impartial reviews, access to public information, and services for City government and the public." The current auditor is Simone Rede.

Duties 
Portland has had a city auditor since 1868, and the position has been elected by voters since 1891. The main divisions of the auditor's office are Audit Services, Code Hearings Office, Independent Police Review, the Ombudsman, Archives and Records Management, Management Services, and Council Clerk/Contracts. Management Services is in charge of overseeing elections and lobbyist registration.

History 
From 2015 until leaving office in 2022, Auditor Hull Caballero and the City Commission had disagreements as to the budget of the Auditor's office. Hull Caballero sought more autonomy for her office. The auditor's office is in charge of auditing the bureaus overseen by the city commissioners and many accused the city commission of corruption and attempting to hide what their bureaus are doing by giving the auditor a smaller budget than necessary.

In 2020, Mayor Ted Wheeler was fined for making the list of his top contributors in a font "too small for the average reader" on  campaign literature. City law requires the names of top donors on websites and literature of city candidates.

In 2020, Mayoral Candidate Ozzie Gonzalez was forced to disclose the names of his top contributors on his website as required by city law.

See also 

 Government of Portland, Oregon

References 

Government of Portland, Oregon